Pollia undosa, common name : the waved goblet, is a species of sea snail, a marine gastropod mollusk in the family Pisaniidae, the true whelks.

Description
The shell size varies between 20 mm and 45 mm, with the average size ranging from 35 mm to 40 mm. Usually the shell has dark brown ribs and orange background, but there are several different variations of color.  It is an active hunter of other molluscs, feeding on snails, slugs, mussels and clams.

The ovate, bi-conic shell is quite thick and solid. It is of a reddish white, and covered with a brown, velvety epidermis. The six whorls are moderate, pretty distinct, and provided with decurrent, subnodulous striae, of a brownish or blackish red. The intervals are white, and furnished with very fine striae scarcely apparent. The body whorl is much larger than all the others together, and has five or six thick, obtuse longitudinal folds of ribs, which are rarely continued as far as the base of the shell, and oftentimes form only tubercles, particularly in old shells. The aperture is ovate, elongated, whitish, and bordered with yellow. The siphonal canal is slightly prolonged, emargination slight and oblique. The outer lip, which is thickened by age, is denticulated throughout its whole length, and furrowed internally. The columella is wrinkled and covered at its base with a thin, raised callosity.

Distribution
This marine species occurs in the Red Sea, in the Indian Ocean off Aldabra, Chagos and Tanzania and in the Western Pacific Ocean (French Polynesia). This species mainly inhabits reef and lagoons but it is widespread in a variety of different habitats.

References

 Linnaeus, C. (1758). Systema Naturae per regna tria naturae, secundum classes, ordines, genera, species, cum characteribus, differentiis, synonymis, locis. Editio decima, reformata. Laurentius Salvius: Holmiae. ii, 824 pp.
 Dautzenberg, Ph. (1929). Contribution à l'étude de la faune de Madagascar: Mollusca marina testacea. Faune des colonies françaises, III(fasc. 4). Société d'Editions géographiques, maritimes et coloniales: Paris. 321–636, plates IV-VII pp.
 Drivas, J. & M. Jay (1988). Coquillages de La Réunion et de l'île Maurice
 Richmond, M. (Ed.) (1997). A guide to the seashores of Eastern Africa and the Western Indian Ocean islands. Sida/Department for Research Cooperation, SAREC: Stockholm, Sweden. . 448 pp
 Arianna Fulvo et Roberto Nistri (2005). 350 coquillages du monde entier. Delachaux et Niestlé (Paris) : 256 p.
 Jerome M. Eisenberg – Conchiglie – Istituto Geografico De Agostini (1981)
 Liu J.Y. [Ruiyu] (ed.). (2008). Checklist of marine biota of China seas. China Science Press. 1267 pp. 
 Tröndlé J. (2013) Description de Pollia krauseri n. sp. (Mollusca: Gastropoda: Buccinidae) des Iles Marquises (Polynésie française). Novapex 14(4): 93-96

External links
 
 Reeflex
 Reef Central

Pisaniidae
Gastropods described in 1758
Taxa named by Carl Linnaeus